Trichaetoides is a genus of moths in the family Erebidae erected by Jeremy Daniel Holloway in 1988.

Species
Trichaetoides albifrontalis (Pagenstecher, 1885)
Trichaetoides albiplaga (Walker, 1862)
Trichaetoides apicalis (Walker, 1856)
Trichaetoides borealis Rothschild, 1912
Trichaetoides chloroleuca (Walker, 1859)
Trichaetoides divisura (Walker, 1862)
Trichaetoides hosei (Rothschild, 1910)
Trichaetoides separabilis (Walker, 1862)

References

Syntomini
Moth genera